Disorderly Conduct is a 1932 American Pre-Code film directed by John W. Considine Jr. starring Spencer Tracy, Sally Eilers and Ralph Bellamy. It was the seventh picture Tracy made under his contract with Fox Film Corporation, and the first to make a profit since his debut Up the River.

Mordaunt Hall, in his review for The New York Times, praised the film's "racy dialogue and highly commendable performances", but bemoaned the "strained and implausible" story.

Plot
A policeman (Spencer Tracy) becomes involved with a young woman (Sally Eilers) after clashing with her politician father (Ralph Morgan).

Cast
Spencer Tracy - Dick Fay
Sally Eilers - Phyllis Crawford
El Brendel - Olsen
Dickie Moore - Jimmy
Ralph Bellamy - Captain Tom Manning
Ralph Morgan - James Crawford
Alan Dinehart - Fletcher
Frank Conroy - Tony Alsotto
Cornelius Keefe - Stallings
Geneva Mitchell - Phoebe Darnton
Sally Blane - Helen Burke
Nora Lane - Gwen Fiske
Charley Grapewin - Limpy

References

External links

1932 films
Fox Film films
1932 comedy films
American comedy films
Films produced by William Fox
American black-and-white films
1930s English-language films
1930s American films